The Indiana Collegiate Conference (ICC) was a college athletic conference in the United States from 1951 to 1978. It consisted solely of schools in Indiana.

The charter members of the conference were Indiana State University, Butler University,  Valparaiso University, the University of Evansville, Ball State University, Saint Joseph's College (Indiana), and in 1953 DePauw University.

History

Early years
The conference was an offshoot of the older, larger Indiana Intercollegiate Conference; and was established for the 1950-51 academic year.  It took a couple of years before all members were able to play full conference schedules.  While the membership was limited to Indiana-based colleges, their profiles varied from the larger, public colleges (Indiana State and Ball State) to the smaller, secular schools such as the Roman Catholic-affiliated Saint Joseph's, to the Methodist-chartered Evansville and Lutheran-established Valparaiso.  Independent schools such as Butler and DePauw were also members, Butler having recently been a member of the Mid-American Conference.  The ICC would be guided by various commissioners during the early years, the first full-time commissioner Jim Hinga, was not hired until 1968; prior to Hinga's selection, the position was filled by part-time commissioners, like LeRoy Heminger of Franklin College.  In addition, the conference maintained a rotating presidency, filled by long-time educational administrators such as Dr. Joseph Nygaard of Indianapolis and S.T. "Cy" Proffitt of Terre Haute.

In addition to the varied affiliations of the schools themselves, the athletic programs were a mixture of NCAA and NAIA member schools; some (Indiana State and Ball State notably) were simultaneous members of both collegiate athletic associations.  Indiana State continued as an NAIA power in men's basketball; their dominance had begun while an Indiana Intercollegiate Conference member; participating in 5 NAIA tournaments and finishing 3rd Nationally in 1953.

Football
The conference celebrated its football-centric glory years in the 1950s and 1960s. Butler won fourteen conference titles; Saint Joseph's won a share of the 1956 NAIA Football National Championship, playing to a 0-0 tie with Montana State.  Valparaiso participated in the 1951 Cigar Bowl, following an undefeated season.  The Crusaders would win the conference three seasons later, anchored by NFL great Fuzzy Thurston.  
Jim Wacker, long-time college football coach was a member of the Valparaiso football team from 1955–59; leading them to a record of 21-12-2; he was named 2nd team All-Conference following the 1959 season.

Future Coach Bill Lynch was a star at Butler and would later coach them and former members, the DePauw Tigers and the Ball State Cardinals.  One of the Ball State Cardinals' all-time greats Timmy Brown starred in the ICC before moving on to a ten-year career in the NFL.  Future basketball coach, Norm Ellenberger was an All-ICC football player at Butler for Coach Tony Hinkle.  Bill Doba, former Head Coach for Washington State is also a conference alumnus.

The "football-side" of the conference also became known as the Heartland Collegiate Conference, as Ashland University of Ohio became a member for football only in 1978.

Basketball
The 1960s were the pinnacle of ICC basketball, especially the University of Evansville Purple Aces; who under legendary coach Arad McCutchan won NCAA College Division (now Div II) National Titles in 1959, 1960, 1964, 1965 and 1971.  McCutchan was named the National College Division Coach of the Year in 1964 and 1965.

The 1967-68 season was memorable as the Indiana State Sycamores were the College Division National Finalists.  In addition, 4 ICC players were named All-American; Jerry Newsom (Indiana State) - 1st team, Tom Niemeier (Evansville) - 2nd team, Dick Jones (Valparaiso) & Howie Pratt (Evansville) - 3rd team.

The ICC also had many legendary players and coaches over the years; the most well-known were Tony Hinkle, Arad McCutchan, John Longfellow, Gene Bartow, Elmer McCall and Duane Klueh all served as head coaches in the conference.

The most notable ICC players included Jerry Sloan, Bobby Plump, Oscar Evans, Ed Smallwood, Don Buse, Larry Humes, Jerry Newsom, Butch Wade, Billy Shepherd, Don Bielke and Steve Newton.  Longtime NCAA basketball officials Ted Hillary and Steve "Whale" Welmer; are conference alumni of St Joseph's Pumas and Evansville Purple Aces, respectively.  Seven ICC players would be awarded the NCAA College Division MVP/MOP Award between the 1957-58 & 1970-71 seasons; Ed Smallwood (1958, 1960), Hugh Ahlering (1959), Jerry Sloan (1964, 1965), Jerry Newsom (1968) & Don Buse (1971).  Cal Luther played at Valparaiso before beginning a long and successful college coaching career.  St. Joseph College's Jim Thordsen was the conference MVP in 1973, 1974 and 1975; Thordsen was also named a Division II All-American.

The ICC posted of 88 "1,000+ career scorers," in men's basketball.  The leading scorer in the history of the conference is Evansville's legendary, Larry Humes of Madison, Indiana.  Humes finished his outstanding career with 2,236.

Baseball
Well-known college basketball coach, Norm Ellenberger was an All-ICC pitcher and was the baseball MVP in 1954;   Future college basketball coach, Wayne Boultinghouse, was the baseball MVP in 1964, he would spend 4 seasons in the St. Louis Cardinals farm system before beginning a college basketball coaching career.  Merv Rettenmund would star in the ICC before moving to the Major Leagues, where he was a steady performer for the Baltimore Orioles and Cincinnati Reds.  He played in 4 World Series; winning titles with the 1969 Orioles and 1975 Reds.  He and teammate Steve Hargan were well-established stars under Ray Louthen.

Future college coach, Dick Tomey was a baseball star at DePauw, 3x letterman, All-ICC (Honorable Mention), and would forge a 29-year career as a FBS Head Coach (Hawai'i, Arizona and San Jose State), recording an overall record of 183-145-7, a 5-3 bowl record and a Pac-10 title (Arizona - 1993).  He was twice Conference Coach of the Year (WAC-1981, Pac 10-1992).

The Valparaiso Crusaders won 17 ICCs titles, with 15 coming under the leadership of long-time baseball coach Emory G. Bauer. He coached the Crusaders to 11 NCAA tournament appearances, with 5 coming in the NCAA Division I tournament.  The Indiana State Sycamores were also dominant in ICC baseball, winning titles in 1957, 1958, 1964, 1966 under Coach Paul Wolf.  Wolf was named the ICC Coach of the Year in 1958, 1963, 1966 and 1967, he also sent players such as Jeff James and Danny Lazar to the Major Leagues.

Other sports

Golf
Future Vice President of the United States Dan Quayle was a 3-time letterman (1967–69) on the varsity golf team at DePauw, finishing 10th in the conference match as a Sophomore.  The Indiana State Sycamores won the ICC in 1953, 1966, 1967 and 1968.  Indiana State also won an NAIA Regional in 1962, advancing to the NAIA National Tournament.  This was the Sycamores' 2nd trip to NAIA Nationals, as they also competed in 1953.  The St Joseph's Pumas finished 2nd in the NAIA National Tournament.

Ball State University hosted the NAIA National Championships during the 1957–58, 1958–59 and 1959–60 seasons; they placed 5th in the NCAA National Tournament in 1968.

Swimming and Diving
Indiana State's program featured 5 NAIA individual champions during the 1962–63, 1963–64 and 1964–65 seasons.

Valparaiso won the 1969-70 ICC team title; Indiana State won the 1963–64, 1965–66 and 1967–68 titles.  Evansville won the 1964-65 title.

Swim/Dive Champions by season

Track and field
The Indiana State Mile Relay Team participated in the NCAA Finals; the team was undefeated during the season; winning the Conference title, the 'Big State' Meet (all Indiana colleges), placed first at the IU relays, won the Mason-Dixon Games (Louisville, KY) title and the 'Central Collegiate Conference' meet.  Relay team members were: Peter Howe, Tom Walters, Rich Rardin, Errol White

Wrestling
Indiana State produced 12 NAIA All-Americans, finishing in the Top Ten at the NAIA National Championships 3 times in 6 seasons of NAIA affiliation before being re-classified as an NCAA University program. The Sycamores hosted the NAIA National meet in 1964-65.  The Sycamores subsequently produced 2 NCAA All-Americans and participated in the NCAA National Championships before withdrawing from the conference following the 1967-68 season.

Final years
The 1970s saw many of the conference's athletic programs depart for other conferences, as Ball State and Indiana State became Division I programs in the late 1960s. Despite the addition of Indianapolis (formerly Indiana Central) and Wabash in 1970, the conference officially disbanded in 1978.

Despite the ICC disbanding for all other sports, the HCC continued to sponsor Division II football until 1989 when Butler, Valparaiso, Indianapolis, St. Joseph's, and Ashland all joined the Midwest Intercollegiate Football Conference (now part of the Great Lakes Intercollegiate Athletic Conference). Butler and Valparaiso moved to the Division I Pioneer Football League in 1993.

In 1997 the official records of the conference from 1950 to 1979 were moved from Terre Haute, Indiana onto the campus of DePauw University, becoming part of the Indiana Collegiate Conference/Special Collections Library. The archive also contains an extensive assortment of images and memorabilia from each member university.

Members
Ball State (1950–1968)
Butler (1950–1978)
Evansville (1950–1977)
Indiana State (1950–1968)
Saint Joseph's (Ind.) (1950–1978)
Valparaiso (1950–1978)
DePauw (1953–1977)
Indianapolis (1970–1977)
Wabash (1970–1976)

Membership timeline

Subsequent conference affiliations

Conference champions

Men's basketball

Conference champions by school

Valparaiso
(1951)           1          1973-co

MVP winners by school

Coach of the year winners by school

Football

Conference champions by school

ICC Back (offense) of the Year winners by school

Baseball

Conference champions by school

Notes
Indiana State won the All-Sports Trophy (best cumulative finish for all sports) 5 times, 4 consecutively; 1962–63 and 1964–65, 1965–66, 1966–67 and 1967-68. The Sycamores then committed to transitioning their athletic program from NCAA Div II to NCAA Div I.

See also
List of defunct college football conferences

References

Further reading

 
Sports leagues established in 1950
1950 establishments in Indiana
1979 disestablishments in Indiana
Articles which contain graphical timelines
Sports leagues disestablished in 1979